Dorris Evangeline Shelton Still (25 August 1904 in Kangding, Kham province of Tibet - 29 April 1997) was an American writer, who wrote the book Sue in Tibet, a semi-biographical work about growing up in Tibet.

Biography 
She was the eldest daughter of Albert Shelton (1875-1922), an American missionary, who was stationed in the remote border town of Batang between 1908 and 1921. Batang was part of the Kham region of eastern Tibet.

In 1921, she and her sister were sent off to boarding school in the United States. Her father was shortly afterwards killed by bandits in a raid.

Like her father and mother, she wrote a book about life in Tibet. Her book titled Sue in Tibet, was published later in the 1930s or 40s. It was a rare book in its time, in that the main character and heroine of the adventures was a girl.

Shelton Still would later engage herself in Tibetan causes and also met the 14th Dalai Lama.

References 

1904 births
1997 deaths
American expatriates in Tibet
20th-century American novelists
American women novelists
20th-century American women writers